Soyib Kurbonov (born 3 February 1988) is an Uzbekistani judoka. He competed at the 2016 Summer Olympics in the men's 100 kg event, in which he was eliminated in the first round by Artem Bloshenko.

References

External links

 
 
 

1988 births
Living people
Uzbekistani male judoka
Olympic judoka of Uzbekistan
Judoka at the 2016 Summer Olympics
Asian Games medalists in judo
Judoka at the 2014 Asian Games
Asian Games bronze medalists for Uzbekistan
Universiade medalists in judo
Medalists at the 2014 Asian Games
Universiade bronze medalists for Uzbekistan
Medalists at the 2013 Summer Universiade
21st-century Uzbekistani people